The Missing White House Tapes is a comedy album released as a satiric commentary on the Watergate scandal and is a spin-off from National Lampoon magazine. The recording was produced by Irving Kirsch and Vic Dinnerstein.  It was released as a single on Blue Thumb Records in 1973.  It was expanded into an album, which was subsequently nominated for a Grammy Award as Best Comedy Recording of the year.

The single consists of a doctored speech, in which Richard Nixon confesses culpability in the Watergate break-in.  Side One of the album contains additional doctored recordings of Nixon's speeches and press conferences.  Side Two contains sketches performed by John Belushi, Chevy Chase, Rhonda Coullet, and Tony Scheuren.

Tracks
SIDE ONE
 Checkers
 Calendar
 Oval Office
 President's Qualities
 The New VP
 Inspiration
 Energy Crisis
 Hearings
 Send Money
 Admission Speech (from the single)
 Wrap Up
SIDE TWO
 Introduction and Impeachment Parade
 Pennsylvania Avenue
 News
 Plumber Commercial
 Impeachment Day Parade Continued
 The Constitution Game
 News
 Senate Hearings
 Impeachment Day Parade Continued
 Tooth Commercial
 Mission Impeachable
 News
 The FBI
 Impeachment, Swearing Out
 The Gerry Ford Show

References

External links
 Mark's Very Large National Lampoon Site

National Lampoon albums
American comedy radio programs
Blue Thumb Records albums
1974 albums
1970s comedy albums
Works about the Watergate scandal